The political divisions of Bosnia and Herzegovina were created by the Dayton Agreement. The Agreement divides the country into two federal entities: the Federation of Bosnia and Herzegovina (FBiH) and the Republika Srpska (RS) and one condominium named the Brčko District.

The Federation of Bosnia and Herzegovina (FBiH) is composed of mostly Bosniaks and Croats, while the Republika Srpska (RS) is composed of mostly Serbs.

Each entity governs roughly one half of the state's territory. The Federation of Bosnia and Herzegovina itself has a federal structure and consists of 10 autonomous cantons.

Overview 

The Federation and the Republika Srpska governments are charged with overseeing internal functions. Each has its own government, flag and coat of arms, president, legislature, police force, customs, and postal system. The police sectors are overseen by the state-level ministry of safety affairs. Since 2005, Bosnia and Herzegovina has one set of Armed forces.

The Inter-Entity Boundary Line is not determined by natural geographical features of the country. It rather follows the military front-lines as they were at the end of the Bosnian War. On the ground, there is no active border between RS and FBiH, and one would generally not know the difference when crossing from one entity into another.

The city of Brčko in northeastern Bosnia is a seat of the Brčko District, a self-governing administrative unit; it is part of both the Federation and Republika Srpska. The district remains under international supervision.

The Federation is further divided into ten cantons, which are then subdivided into municipalities. The Republika Srpska is divided directly into municipalities.

List

See also
 Proposed Croat federal unit in Bosnia and Herzegovina

References

Further reading

External links 

 A precarious peace, The Economist, 22 January 1998
 The EU's pseudosuccess in Bosnia, Centre for Eastern Studies 2011
 Bosnia and Herzegovina: Ongoing erosion of the State, Centre for Eastern Studies 2011

 
 
Politics of Bosnia and Herzegovina
Bosnia and Herzegovina, Political divisions
Bosnia and Herzegovina
Reform in Bosnia and Herzegovina